Jean-Marc Daniel (born 26 April 1954) is a French Economist, Professor at ESCP Business School and editorial Director of Societal magazine. He describes himself as a classic liberal.

He is a Columnist for the newspaper Le Monde (on the history of economic ideas) and on BFM Business. He is a member of the board of Directors of the Société d'économie politique  and of the editorial committee for the l’Année des professions financières, a reference work in economy and finance, published each year by the Centre des professions financières.

Selected bibliography 
 La Politique économique, Que sais-je ?, éd. PUF, 2008 
 Histoire vivante de la pensée économique, des crises et des hommes, Pearson, 2010 
 Le Socialisme de l’excellence. Combattre les rentes et promouvoir les talents, Paris, François Bourin, 2011, 182 pages
 With Henri Sterdyniak, Présidence Sarkozy : quel bilan ?, Prométhée, 2012 
 Huit leçons d'histoire économique, Paris, Odile Jacob, 2012  
 Ricardo reviens ! ils sont restés keynesiens, Broché, 2012
 L'État de connivence, Broché, 2014
 Le Gâchis français : histoire de quarante ans de mensonges économiques, Broché, 2015
 Valls, Macron : le socialisme de l'excellence à la française, Broché, 2016
 Les Impôts. Histoire d’une folie française. Soixante ans de matraquage fiscal, Taillandier, 2017 
 Macron, la valse folle de Jupiter, L'Archipel, 2018

Awards 
 Chevalier of the Légion d'honneur (2015)
 Zerilli-Marimò award (2019)

References

1954 births
Living people
French economists
École Polytechnique alumni
Chevaliers of the Légion d'honneur